The balance beam is an artistic gymnastics event held at the Summer Olympics on which only women compete.  Women started competing in and earning medals at apparatus finals in 1952.

Medalists

Women

Multiple medalists

Medalists by country

Gallery

References

Balance beam